The FIBA Oceania Championship for Women 1985 was the qualifying tournament of FIBA Oceania for the 1986 FIBA World Championship for Women. Australia won the series 2–0 to win its fourth consecutive Oceania Championship.

Results

References

FIBA Oceania Championship for Women
Championship
1985 in New Zealand basketball
1985 in Australian basketball
International basketball competitions hosted by Australia
Australia women's national basketball team games
New Zealand women's national basketball team games